PFFR is a Brooklyn-based production company and art collective consisting of Vernon Chatman, John Lee, Alyson Levy and formerly Jim Tozzi until 2009. The group has been active since 1998.

Work
The group's portfolio of work includes two albums, one 7-inch EP and one download-only EP (plus a string of live performances as a band), various art exhibits such as An Attack On All Americans or the Tyranny Of Weed shown at the LFL Gallery in New York and the script for the film Final Flesh. In 2010, they held an exhibition/video screening of a selection of their work entitled PFFR Presents Legacy IIX which took place at the Synchronicity Space in Los Angeles, CA between April 3 and May 1.

PFFR are also active in television comedy. They wrote, directed, produced and starred in the MTV2 variety show Wonder Showzen (2005–2006) and the Adult Swim CGI series Xavier: Renegade Angel. For both these shows, Chatman and Lee are the directors and main voice talent, whilst Tozzi and Levy are the animation/character designer and art director, respectively. Levy provides additional voices for both shows whilst Tozzi does only for 'Xavier'. PFFR are also responsible for producing, directing and co-writing Jon Glaser's Adult Swim show Delocated.

Chatman and Lee collaborated on Doggy Fizzle Televizzle, a short lived sketch show starring Snoop Dogg, although this was not an official PFFR production. Following this show, Snoop Dogg made a guest appearance on PFFR's 'United We Doth' LP as well as a second-season episode of Xavier: Renegade Angel.

In 2015, PFFR produced and directed the music video for Animal Collective's song FloriDada, the first single off of their album Painting With.

Individual achievements
Chatman provided the voice for South Park character Towelie and worked as a staff writer/consultant on the show in 2004. He returned to the show in 2009 as a producer. He has written for Matt Stone and Trey Parker's short lived sitcom That's My Bush, Late Night with Conan O'Brien and The Chris Rock Show.

Levy directed the documentary film The Hands Of God about Christian puppeteers. She had a photography exhibition at Momenta Art, Brooklyn, in 2000 which featured a selection of photographs depicting various spoof sitcom scenes starring herself and friend Janeane Garofalo. She is also married to Lee.

Tozzi is an independent artist and has worked as a member of the production companies KanDoKid and T.H.E.M. directing a number of television commercials. Tozzi parted ways with PFFR in 2009, following the production of Xavier: Renegade Angel.

Lee was previously a member of the now defunct rock band Muckafurgason. He is known as a supertaster through the song "John Lee Supertaster" by the alternative rock band They Might Be Giants, with whom he is close friends.

PFFR Productions

PFFR Productions (otherwise known as PFFFR in the closing logo) is an American film and television arm of PFFR. The company is best known for television and film productions aimed at mature audience, with such shows like MTV's Wonder Showzen, as well as Adult Swim's Xavier: Renegade Angel. They also produced the 2008 Adult Swim pilot Neon Knome, which would later be worked as The Problem Solverz on Cartoon Network in 2011. Other shows include Delocated, The Heart She Holler and The Shivering Truth (all for Adult Swim), as well as "At Home With Amy Sedaris"(for truTV).

The on-screen logo features a creature, who is the "mascot" for PFFR's 2005 EP Chrome Ghost.

Releases

Studio albums
Rock Rocker Rocketh (CD) (2001, self-released)
Injustice Center (12-inch) (2002, Invasion Planète Recordings)
United We Doth (CD) (2003, Birdman)

Extended plays
Chrome Ghost (download) (2005, Birdman-A-Phone)
Dark Louds Over Red Meat (7-inch) (2018, Housewife Records)

Music videos
"Superfine" (from Rock Rocker Rocketh and United We Doth)
"Japoney Appoe" (from Rock Rocker Rocketh and United We Doth)
"Our Concern" (from Injustice Center and United We Doth)
"Feels Like $" (from Injustice Center and United We Doth)

Television shows
Doggy Fizzle Televizzle (2002–2003; an unofficial PFFFR production created by Chatman & Lee)
Wonder Showzen (2005–2006)
Xavier: Renegade Angel (2007–2009)
Delocated (2008–2013)
The Heart, She Holler (2011–2014)
Neon Joe, Werewolf Hunter (2015–2017)
Jon Glaser Loves Gear (2016–2019)
At Home with Amy Sedaris (2017)
The Shivering Truth (2018–2020)
Teenage Euthanasia (2021–present)

Failed pilots
Neon Knome (2008; picked up as The Problem Solverz, which PFFR was not involved in)
Doble Fried (2015; in co-production with Titmouse, Inc.)
Dustin's Dad's Dilemma (in Stereo); (2016)
M.O.P.Z. (2016; in co-production with Mechanical Dreams)
Gigglefudge, USA! (2016; in co-production with Everything Is Terrible!)
The Suplex Duplex Complex (2017; in co-production with Ten Acre Films)
Hunky Boys Go Ding-Dong (2018)
Pervert Everything (2018; in co-production with AB Video Solutions, LLC)
Di Bibl (2019)
	Rate The Cookie (2020)

TV specials
Ballmastrz: Rubicon (2023; in co-production with Studio 4°C)

Films
Final Flesh (2009)
The Hands of God (2012)
Untitled Kendrick Lamar Project (TBD)

References

External links

PFFR at Birdman Records
PFFR at IMDb
Audio interview with Lee & Chatman on the public radio show The Sound of Young America (also features Jim Gaffigan)
Archived interview with PFFR by Jason Thompson shortly after the release of Rock, Rocker, Rocketh.  Originally published on the Echo From Esoterica website.

 
American artist groups and collectives
Musical collectives
Alternative rock groups from New York (state)
American experimental musical groups
Avant-garde ensembles
American music video directors
Electronic music groups from New York (state)
Indie rock musical groups from New York (state)
Musical groups from Brooklyn
Psychedelic rock music groups from New York (state)
Birdman Records artists